Miniopterus, known as the bent-winged or long winged bats, is the sole genus of the family Miniopteridae. They are small flying insectivorous mammals, micro-bats of the order Chiroptera, with wings over twice the length of the body. The genus had been placed in its own subfamily among the vespertilionid bats, as Miniopterinae,  but is now classified as its own family.

Taxonomy 
The genus was erected in 1837 by Charles L. Bonaparte. In the first systematic revision of the genus, published in a monograph of Miniopterus in 1858 by Robert F. Tomes, the author reallocated specimens and described new taxa.
A new systematic arrangement was produced in an extensive study of poorly known chiropterans of the Indo-Austral region by James E. Hill in 1985, the greater resolution of the genus being determined by the British Museum of Natural History's acquisition of new series of specimens collected in Fiji, the New Hebrides and New Caledonia and the extensive collection made in New Guinea by ecologist Ben Gaskell on "Operation Drake".

Recognised as a very widely dispersed group with distinct morphology, biology and genetic characters, the number of species and systematic arrangements varied between still contradictory treatments. The genus was nested  within Vespertilionidae as Miniopterinae, one of five subfamilies, with doubts remaining on the relationships to sister groups. The position of the minopterines was determined as showing a phylogenetic relationship to either the vespertilionids or the molossids, these assumptions were compared and analysed in study using large data sets derived from multiple genetic indicators and statistical analysis to determine the basal relationships within the order Chiroptera. The authors of this 2007 study found support for elevation to the rank of family—as Miniopteridae—and that the vespertilionids and Miniopterus species formed a clade that had diverged from the molossids (free-tailed bats) at a period around 54–43 million years ago and from other species 49–38 mya.

Morphology 
Bent-winged bats are typically small (total length c. 10 cm, wingspans 30–35 cm, mass less than 20 g), with broad, short muzzles. The cranium is bulbous and taller than the snout, a feature shared with woolly bats and mouse-eared bats. This combination of  features was likely present in the common ancestor of the vesper bats. They have two tiny, vestigial premolars between the upper canines and first large premolar. Unlike other bats, they lack a tendon-locking mechanism in their toes.

The common name bent-winged bat refers to their most obvious feature, the group's ability to fold back an exceptionally long third finger when the wings are folded. This finger gives the bats long, narrow wings that allows them to move at high speed in open environments and in some species to migrate over a distance of hundreds of kilometres. The proportional length of the wing is around two and a half times that of the body and head.

Research applications
In 2017, evidence of deltaretroviruses was found in the genome of the Miniopteridae.
Deltaretroviruses only affect mammals, and this was the first evidence that they affected bat species.
The presence of the deltaretrovirus in multiple Miniopterid species suggests that the virus was present in the family before speciation 20 million years ago.
The evolutionary history of deltaretroviruses is important because they cause leukemia in humans.

Classification
Family Miniopteridae
Genus Miniopterus - long-winged bats
Aellen's long-fingered bat, Miniopterus aelleni
African long-fingered bat, Miniopterus africanus
Montagne d’Ambre long-fingered bat, Miniopterus ambohitrensis
†Miniopterus approximatus (fossil, Pliocene)
Sandy long-fingered bat, Miniopterus arenarius
Little bent-wing bat, Miniopterus australis
Javanese long-fingered bat, Miniopteris blepotis
Long-fingered bat, Miniopterus brachytragos (Madagascar long-fingered bat)
Eger's long-fingered bat, Miniopterus egeri
Eschscholtz's long-fingered bat, Miniopteris eschscholtzii 
†Miniopterus fossilis (fossil, Miocene)
Lesser long-fingered bat, Miniopterus fraterculus
Eastern bent-wing bat, Miniopterus fuliginosus
Southeast Asian long-fingered bat, Miniopterus fuscus
Glen's long-fingered bat, Miniopterus gleni
Griffith's long-fingered bat, Miniopterus griffithsi
Comoro long-fingered bat, Miniopterus griveaudi
Greater long-fingered bat, Miniopterus inflatus
Small Melanesian long-fingered bat, Miniopterus macrocneme
Maghrebian bent-winged bat, Miniopterus maghrebensis
Western bent-winged bat, Miniopterus magnater
Mahafaly long-fingered bat, Miniopterus mahafaliensis
Major's long-fingered bat, Miniopterus majori
Manavi long-fingered bat, Miniopterus manavi
Intermediate long-fingered bat, Miniopterus medius
Least long-fingered bat, Miniopterus minor
Mozambique long-fingered bat, Miniopterus mossambicus
Natal long-fingered bat, Miniopterus natalensis
Newton's long-fingered bat, Miniopterus newtoni
Nimba long-fingered bat, Miniopterus nimbae
Australasian bent-wing bat, Miniopterus orianae
Pale bent-winged bat, Miniopterus pallidus
Philippine long-fingered bat, Miniopterus paululus
Peterson's long-fingered bat Miniopterus petersoni
Small bent-winged bat, Miniopterus pusillus
Loyalty bent-winged bat, Miniopterus robustior
Miniopterus rummeli (fossil, Miocene)
Common bent-wing bat, Miniopterus schreibersii
Shortridge's long-fingered bat Miniopterus shortridgei
Sororcula long-fingered bat, Miniopterus sororculus
†Miniopterus tao (fossil, Pleistocene)
Great bent-winged bat, Miniopterus tristis
Villiers's bent-winged bat, Miniopterus villiersi
Wilson's long-fingered bat, Miniopterus wilsoni
†Miniopterus zapfei (fossil, Miocene)

Range 
Bent-winged bats occur in southern Europe, across Africa and Madagascar, throughout Asia, and in Australia, Vanuatu and New Caledonia. One species, the common bent-wing bat, inhabits the whole of this range. The group rapidly colonized much of this area in the last 15,000 years.

See also
List of bats of Madagascar

References

Goodman, S. M., K. E. Ryan, C. P. Maminirina, J. Fahr, L. Christidis, and B. Appleton. 2007.  Specific status of populations on Madagascar referred to Miniopterus fraterculus (Chiroptera: Vespertillionidae), with description of a new species.  Journal of Mammalogy, 88:1216-1229.
 Goodman, S.M., Maminirina, C.P., Weyeneth, N., Bradman, H.M., Christidis, L., Ruedi, M. & Appleton, B. 2009. The use of molecular and morphological characters to resolve the taxonomic identity of cryptic species: the case of Miniopterus manavi (Chiroptera: Miniopteridae). Zoologica Scripta 38: 339-363
Mein, P. and Ginsburg, L. 2002. Sur l'âge relatif des différents karstiques miocènes de La Grive-Saint-Alban (Isère). Cahiers scientifiques, Muséum d'Histoire naturelle, Lyon 2:7–47.
Miller-Butterworth, C., Murphy, W., O'Brien, S., Jacobs, D., Springer, M. and Teeling, E. 2007. A family matter: Conclusive resolution of the taxonomic position of the long-fingered bats, Miniopterus. Molecular Biology and Evolution 24(7):1553–1561.
Simmons, N. B. 2005. Order Chiroptera. pp. 312–529 in Mammal Species of the World a Taxonomic and Geographic Reference. D. E. Wilson and D. M. Reeder eds. Johns Hopkins University Press, Baltimore.
Furman, A., Öztunç, T. & Çoraman, E. 2010b. On the phylogeny of Miniopterus schreibersii schreibersii and Miniopterus schreibersii pallidus from Asia Minor in reference to other Miniopterustaxa (Chiroptera: Vespertilionidae). Acta Chiropterologica 12, 61-72.

 
Bat genera
Taxa named by Charles Lucien Bonaparte
Extant Miocene first appearances